Bodung is a village in Viken, Norway.

Villages in Viken (county)